Jacob Edvardsson Munch ( 9 August 1776 – 10 June 1839) was a Norwegian military officer and painter.

Biography
Munch was born in Christiania, Norway.
He was educated at the Academy of Fine Arts in Copenhagen (1804–1806) and later Paris. His teacher was French Neoclassical painter Jacques-Louis David. After his studies, he worked in Italy and Germany.

He painted a series of portraits of the famous people of the time. Munch was invited to Norway in 1813 by future Danish king Christian Frederik. His most notable assignment was the coronation picture of Charles XIV John as king of Norway from 1818. The coronation of Charles XIV John at Nidaros Cathedral was made on royal order. 

Jacob Munch co-founded the Norwegian National Academy of Craft and Art Industry in Christiania in 1818 and also worked as a teacher there.

Family
Jacob was a son of inspector Edvard Munch (1738–1793) and Petronelle Helene Krefting (1746 – 1810).  He married  Emerentze Carlsen Barclay  (1786–1869), whose parents were Christen Carlsen Barclay and Severine Bøhme. They  were the parents of Sophie Edvarda Munch, Emma Wilhelmine Munch, Nicoline Munch and Marie Fredrikke Munch.

His relatives included medical officer Christian Munch (1817–89)  and historian Peter Andreas Munch (1810-1863) as well as the famous painter Edvard Munch (1863–1944).

References

1776 births
1839 deaths
18th-century Norwegian painters
18th-century male artists
19th-century Norwegian painters
19th-century male artists
Norwegian Army personnel
Norwegian military personnel of the Napoleonic Wars
Edvard Munch
Norwegian male painters